Shams al-Dīn Abū ʿAbd Allāh Muḥammad ibn Aḥmad ibn Abī Bakr al-Maqdisī, better known as al-Maqdisī or al-Muqaddasī, ( – 991) was a medieval Arab geographer, author of Aḥsan al-taqāsīm fī maʿrifat al-aqālīm (The Best Divisions in the Knowledge of the Regions), as well as author of the book, Description of Syria (Including Palestine). He is one of the earliest known historical figures to self-identify as a Palestinian during his travels.

Biography

Sources
Outside of his own work, there is little biographical information available about al-Maqdisi. He is neither found in the voluminous biographies of Ibn Khallikan (d. 1282) nor were the aspects of his life mentioned in the works of his contemporaries.

Early life and education

According to historian André Miquel, al-Maqdisi "was very much attached to the Palestine of his birth and to the town whose name he bears". Al-Maqdisī or alternatively al-Muqaddasī was a nisba indicating that he was from "Bayt al-Maqdis" or "Bayt al-Muqaddas", the Muslim names for Jerusalem. His paternal grandfather, Abu Bakr al-Banna, had been responsible for the construction of Acre's maritime fortifications under orders from Ahmad ibn Tulun (r. 868–884), the autonomous Abbasid governor of Egypt and Syria. Al-Maqdisi's maternal grandfather, Abu Tayyib al-Shawwa, moved to Jerusalem from Biyar in Khurasan and was also an architect.

As can be inferred by his work and social background, al-Maqdisi was likely well-educated. Miquel asserts that al-Maqdisi's use of "rhymed prose, even poetry" is indicative of a strong knowledge in Arabic grammar and literature. Likewise, his writings show that he possessed an early interest in Islamic jurisprudence, history, philology and hadith.

Pursuits in geography
Al-Maqdisi made his first Hajj (pilgrimage to Mecca) in 967. During this period, he became determined to devote himself to the study of geography. To acquire the necessary information, he undertook a series of journeys throughout the Islamic world, ultimately visiting all of its lands with the exception of al-Andalus (Iberian Peninsula), Sindh and Sistan. The known dates or date ranges of al-Maqdisi's travels include his journey to Aleppo sometime between 965 and 974, his second pilgrimage to Mecca in 978, a visit to Khurasan in 984 and his stay in Shiraz in 985 when he decided to compose his material. The finished work was titled Aḥsan al-taqāsīm fi maʾarfat al-aqalīm (The Best Divisions for the Knowledge of the Provinces).

Work

Though possibly influenced by predecessors al-Jahiz (d. 869), who introduced the "science of countries", and Ibn al-Faqih (fl. 902), al-Maqdisi "surpassed" both "all to the advantage of what certainly should be called a true geography", according to Miquel. Moreover, Miquel surmises that al-Maqdisi "was probably the first to have desired and conceived" true geography as an "original science", an assertion that al-Maqdisi himself makes in the preface of Aḥsan al-taqāsīm. He belonged to the school known as the "atlas of Islam", inaugurated by Abu Zayd al-Balkhi (d. 934) and developed by Istakhri (d. 957) and al-Maqdisi's contemporary Ibn Hawqal (d. 978).

Al-Balkhi's school almost exclusively dealt with the Islamic world, to which al-Maqdisi too devoted his studies. Al-Maqdisi refers to this world as al-mamlaka or al-Islām (the Domain of Islam), a unique concept in which all of the lands of Islam constituted a single domain. He subdivided this domain into two parts: mamlakat al-ʿArab (domain of the Arabs) and mamlakat al-ʿAjam (domain of the non-Arabs). The former consisted, from east to west, of the six provinces of Iraq, Aqur (Upper Mesopotamia), Arabia, Syria, Egypt and the Maghreb, while the latter consisted of the eight provinces of the Mashriq (Sistan, Afghanistan, Khurasan and Transoxiana), Sindh, Kirman, Fars, Khuzistan, Jibal, Daylam and Rihab (Armenia, Adharbayjan and Aran).

Description of Palestine
Aḥsan al-taqāsīm gives a systematic account of all the places and regions al-Maqdisi had visited. He devoted a section of his book to Bilad al-Sham (the Levant) with a particular focus on Palestine. In contrast to travelers to Palestine, such as Arculf, Nasir Khusraw and others, who were pilgrims, al-Maqdisi gave detailed insights into the region's population, way of life, economy and climate. He paid special attention to Jerusalem, detailing its layout, walls, streets, markets, public structures and landmarks, particularly the Haram ash-Sharif (Temple Mount) and the latter's Dome of the Rock and Jami Al-Aqsa. He described the city's people and customs, focusing on its Muslims, but also its Christian and Jewish communities, whose significant presence he lamented.

Al-Maqdisi also gave extensive overviews of Ramla and Tiberias, the capitals of the Palestine and Jordan districts, respectively. To a lesser extent, he described Acre, Beisan, Bayt Jibrin, Caesarea, Amman and Aila. In his descriptions of the aforementioned cities, al-Maqdisi noted their prosperity and stability and gave a general impression of Palestine as densely populated and wealthy, with numerous localities.

Guy Le Strange comments on al-Maqdisi's work:

Description of Eastern Arabia

Al-Maqdisi mentioned regions in Eastern Arabia which form parts of what are now Saudi Arabia, the UAE and Oman. Al-Hasa is an important oasis region in the eastern part of Saudi Arabia, whereas Tuwwam is another oasis region split between the UAE and Oman, comprising the modern settlements of Al Ain and Al-Buraimi on different sides of the Omani-UAE border. Dibba is another region split between the UAE and Oman, touching the Musandam Peninsula, which is partly ruled by the Emirate of Ras Al Khaimah, where the ancient settlement of Julfar is located.

See also 
List of Arab scientists and scholars
Zedekiah's Cave

References

Bibliography

Further reading

Collins, Basil Anthony: Al-Muqaddasi; the man and His Work, Michigan Geographical Publication, 1974,
Al-Muqaddasi (Basil Anthony Collins (Translator)): The Best Divisions for Knowledge of the Regions. Ahsan al-Taqasim Fi Ma'rifat al-Aqalim. Garnet Publishing, Reading, 1994,

External links 
Al-Muqaddasi
Al-Muqaddasi: An Encyclopaedic Scholar

940s births
991 deaths
10th-century Arabs
10th-century geographers
Balkhi school
Medieval Syrian geographers
Holy Land travellers
Medieval Palestine
Geography of Palestine (region)
Writers from Jerusalem
People from Jerusalem
Travel writers of the medieval Islamic world